Suthee Singhasaneh (22 July 1928 – 3 August 2013) was a Thai politician. He was a Senator, MP, and the Minister of Finance (19861988, 19911992).

Singhasaneh died on August 3, 2013 at the age of 85.

References

1928 births
2013 deaths
Suthee Singhasaneh
Suthee Singhasaneh